Portowiec Gdańsk are a sports club based in Gdańsk, Poland, founded in 1957.

Club names
1957 - Klub Sportowy Portowiec Gdańsk
1969 - MRKS Gdańsk (Maritime Workers' Sports Club Gdańsk) after a merger with Motława Gdańsk
2009 - reactivation of the club under the name Klub Sportowy Portowiec Gdańsk

Football
The sports club enjoyed their greatest success in the 1970s and 1980s when the team spent 7 seasons in the third tier. After troubles off the field the club was dissolved in 2001, being reformed in 2009. Since being reformed and winning promotion in 2010 Portowiec have faced financial issues with the running of the club. Historically the club's colours have been blue and brown.

Rivalries

Having played in the regional leagues for most of their history Portowiec's rivalries have been teams from the Gdańsk area, and as a result games involving the Gdańsk Derby. In the early years of their formation Portowiec had a minor rivalry with the cities giants, Lechia Gdańsk, playing 7 times between 1970–83. Due to the lower levels Portowiec has played in, games against Gedania 1922 Gdańsk, Stoczniowiec Gdańsk, and KP Jaguar Gdańsk holding more weight.

History

Since re-entering the leagues in 2009.

Other sections

Alongside football Portowiec has a section for yachting.

See also 

 Gdańsk Derby
 Sport in Gdańsk

References 

1957 establishments in Poland
Association football clubs established in 1957
Sport in Gdańsk
Football clubs in Pomeranian Voivodeship